Paraplatyptilia catharodactyla is a moth of the family Pterophoridae. It was described by A. J. Gaj in 1959 and it is endemic to Kazakhstan.

References

Moths described in 1959
Moths of Asia
Endemic fauna of Kazakhstan
catharodactyla